Frank Saunders (15 June 1899 – December 1992) was a British long-distance runner. He competed in the men's 5000 metres at the 1924 Summer Olympics.

References

External links
 

1899 births
1992 deaths
Athletes (track and field) at the 1924 Summer Olympics
British male long-distance runners
Olympic athletes of Great Britain
Place of birth missing